is a vertically scrolling run and gun video game developed by Alpha Denshi and published by SNK for the Neo Geo arcade and home systems in 1992. It was released for the Neo Geo CD in 1994.

Gameplay 

The overall gameplay is similar to this of the run-and-gun classic Ikari Warriors, with the players battling their way up the top-down perspective screen. The players can choose between three ninja characters, all with differing abilities. Each of them has fighting game-style input commands that unleash their scroll-based ninpo special moves. As usual in the genre, the game's stages end with boss battles.

Plot 
An elite group of three young Ninja Commandos (Joe Tiger, an American descendant of the Kōga-ryū ninja whose weapons are shuriken, Ryu Eagle, the 23rd descendant of the famous ninja Fūma Kotarō (from the World Heroes series), who is using ninja magic fireballs in combat, and Rayar Dragon, the female ninja of the group, a British girl who has learned the ways of the Iga-ryū ninjutsu and whose weapon is a bow with flaming spirit arrows) from around the world must team-up to stop the villain Spider and his Mars Corporation from using a time machine to destroy the past and control the future. The three heroes chase after their enemy in seven time periods, including the Sengoku period in Japan (where Ryu avenges his ancestor by killing Oda Nobunaga), Ancient Egypt (fighting a floating recreation of Tutankhamen), the Stone Age, China in the era of Three Kingdoms (fighting against Lu Bu), and World War II.

Release 
Ninja Commando was originally released for the Neo Geo arcade machines on May 29, 1992. The Neo Geo CD was released on October 31, 1994.

The game has been re-released on the Wii's Virtual Console in North America on July 14, 2008 (though the Wii Virtual Console version, like most other Neo Geo games, only allows three continues per player, which makes the game very difficult to complete without saving progress). It was also re-released in December 2008 as one of five games in the PlayStation 2 game compilation ADK Damashii. The highest score is by Ian Albrecht with 177,150 points.

Reception 

In Japan, Game Machine listed Ninja Commando on their June 15, 1992 issue as being the eleventh most-successful table arcade unit of the month, outperforming titles such as Raiden. RePlay also reported the game to be the tenth most-popular arcade game at the time. The title was generally well received. The game's review in GamePro praised its "phenomenal!" graphics and called it overall "an excellent two-player cart" that "does an excellent job of filling the void of top-view fun-and-gun game in the Neo-Geo library." Three staff members of Game Informer rated Ninja Commando, respectively, 6.75, 8.0, and 8.75 out of 10. Famicom Tsūshin scored the Neo Geo version of the game a 25 out of 40.

Retrospective reviews

See also 
Ninja Combat
Ninja Master's -Haoh-Ninpo-Cho-
Time Soldiers

Notes

References

External links 
 Ninja Commando at GameFAQs
 Ninja Commando at Giant Bomb
 Ninja Commando at Killer List of Videogames
 Ninja Commando at MobyGames

1992 video games
ACA Neo Geo games
ADK (company) games
Arcade video games
Cooperative video games
D4 Enterprise games
Fictional special forces personnel
Multiplayer and single-player video games
Neo Geo games
Neo Geo CD games
Video games about ninja
Nintendo Switch games
PlayStation Network games
PlayStation 4 games
Run and gun games
Science fiction video games
Sengoku video games
SNK games
SNK Playmore games
Video games based on Romance of the Three Kingdoms
Video games about time travel
Video games featuring female protagonists
Video games scored by Yuka Watanabe
Video games set in Africa
Virtual Console games
Windows games
World War II video games
Xbox One games
Video games developed in Japan
Hamster Corporation games